Frontier Telephone of Rochester, Inc., formerly Rochester Telephone Corporation, is a local telephone operating company of Frontier Communications providing telephone service to Rochester, NY. The company was founded in 1994.

History

In 1995, the original Rochester Telephone Corporation renamed itself Frontier Corporation in order to sound less "local" in the newly competitive landscape. Frontier transferred its Rochester local telephone lines to the "new" Rochester Telephone Corporation. Frontier's investment in fiber long lines proved attractive in the exploding global communications market in the late 1990s when RTC was acquired in 1999 by Global Crossing, a Bermuda-based communications network enterprise.

Citizens Communications acquired Global's local exchange properties, including the Frontier brand, in 2000. Global Crossing filed for Chapter 11 protection at the beginning of 2002, with its remaining assets being sold to China Netcom's subsidiary Asia Netcom.

Under the Frontier brand, Citizens Communications provides telephone, television and Internet services in 24 states. The company changed its name on July 31, 2008, to Frontier Communications Corporation.

References

Telecommunications companies of the United States
Frontier Communications
Companies based in Rochester, New York
Telecommunications companies established in 1994
American companies established in 1994
History of Rochester, New York
Communications in New York (state)